Panizza is an Italian surname. Notable people with the surname include:

 Bartolomeo Panizza (1785–1867), Italian anatomist
 Darrell Panizza (born 1959), Australian footballer and coach
 Ettore Panizza (1875–1967), Argentianian conductor and composer
 Giacomo Panizza (1804–1860), Italian conductor
 John Panizza (1931–1997), Australian politician
 Oskar Panizza (1853–1921), German psychiatrist and author
 Serge Panizza (born 1942), French fencer
 Ugo Panizza, Italian economist
 Wladimiro Panizza (1945–2002), Italian bicycle racer
 Kevin Panizza (born 1963), musician & photographer
 Sergio Panizza (born 1967), pharmacist & Author

See also
 Foramen of Panizza

Italian-language surnames